The Raritan Bay Drawbridge, also known as River-Draw, Raritan Bay Swing Bridge, and Raritan River Railroad Bridge, is a railroad swing bridge crossing the Raritan River  from where it empties into the Raritan Bay in Middlesex County, New Jersey, United States. It connects Perth Amboy to the north and South Amboy to the south.

History
The bridge was built in 1908 to replace one that had been built at the crossing in 1875 to serve the New York and Long Branch Railroad, jointly operated by the Central Railroad of New Jersey (CNJ) and Pennsylvania Railroad (PRR). Near the end of its construction, the bridge was sabotaged by a dynamite blast. A few years after completion, the bridge was damaged in a severe winter storm. The bridge has been owned by several different parties since the CNJ/PRR era: Penn Central (1968–1971), the New Jersey Department of Transportation (to 1983), and New Jersey Transit (NJT).

Operations
The bridge is used by NJT commuter rail on its North Jersey Coast Line and for Conrail-Norfolk Southern rail freight operations.  Federal regulations require the bridge to be open on signal except during rush hour or when a train has passed the home signal for it.

Replacement
The bridge was scheduled to be replaced after suffering structural damage from Hurricane Sandy in 2012. The bridge was overwashed by the storm surge, struck by two tugboats, and had to be realigned before low-speed service could resume a month later. A $446 million federal grant, announced in 2014, will fund construction of a new bridge while trains continue using the existing bridge. A groundbreaking ceremony was held September 15, 2020, with completion projected for 2026.

See also
List of crossings of the Raritan River
NJT movable bridges

References

External links
 Photograph of Raritan Bay Drawbridge from RailPictures.net
 Photograph of Raritan Bay Drawbridge from RailPictures.net
 Photograph of Raritan Bay Drawbridge from RailPictures.net 
 Video of towboat and barge transiting the Raritan River Railroad Bridge (pilothouse perspective)

Railroad bridges in New Jersey
Bridges over the Raritan River
Pennsylvania Railroad bridges
Perth Amboy, New Jersey
South Amboy, New Jersey
Swing bridges in the United States
Bridges in Middlesex County, New Jersey
Bridges in Monmouth County, New Jersey
Bridges completed in 1908
1908 establishments in New Jersey
NJ Transit bridges
Steel bridges in the United States